Maurice Piot (14 July 1912 – 22 May 1996) was a French fencer. He won a bronze medal in the team sabre event at the 1952 Summer Olympics.

References

External links
 

1912 births
1996 deaths
People from Saint-Quentin, Aisne
French male sabre fencers
Olympic fencers of France
Fencers at the 1952 Summer Olympics
Olympic bronze medalists for France
Olympic medalists in fencing
Medalists at the 1952 Summer Olympics
Sportspeople from Aisne